The Chief of the Air Command is the topmost authority in the Royal Danish Air Force. It can trace its history back to the creation of the Chief for the Naval Air Service, in 1913. The current chief of the Air Force is Major general Jan Dam.

History
On 14 December 1911, the Naval Air Service was established. On 25 March 1912, the Royal Danish Navy received its first airplane the Kite, in 1913 the first chief was named. In 1912, the Army Air Corps was established. The first chief was named in 1917. Following the destruction of the air forces during World War II, it was decided that the two forces should be collected under one force. From 1947 till the creation of the RDAF, Torben Ørum served as Combined Army and Naval Air Corps Chief. In 1950, the Air Command and the position of Chief of the Air Force was created. With the creation of the Defence Staff and Chief of Defence, in 1970, the Chief of the Air Force was subjugated to the CoD. In 1982, the title of Chief of the Air Force was changed to become Inspector of the Air Force. Following the 1988 Defence Commission, it was decided that the Air Staff and the positions of Inspector would be removed and then create the Tactical Air Command. Following the Danish Defence Agreement 2013–17, the Tactical Air Command was disbanded and reorganised into the Air Staff. On 1 January 2019, as part of the Danish Defence Agreement 2018–23, the Danish name was changed Air Command.

List of chiefs

Combined Army and Naval Air Corps (1947–1950)

Air Command (1950–1969)

Air Staff (1970–1990)

|-
! colspan=7| Chief of the Air Force

|-
! colspan=7| Inspector of the Air Force

Tactical Air Command (1990–2014)

Air Staff (2014–2018)

Air Command (2019–present)

See also
 Chief of Defence (Denmark)
 Chief of the Royal Danish Army
 Chief of the Royal Danish Navy

Notes

Citations

References

 
 
 
 

Royal Danish Air Force
Military of Denmark
Denmark
Chiefs of Staff (Denmark)